Marc Louis Bazin (March 6, 1932 – June 16, 2010) was a World Bank official, former United Nations functionary and Haitian Minister of Finance and Economy under the dictatorship of Jean-Claude Duvalier. He was prime minister of Haiti appointed on June 4, 1992 by the military government that had seized power on September 30, 1991.

Life 
Born in Saint-Marc, his father, Louis Bazin was a member of the elite in Artibonite. He studied law and economics at the Solvay Institute in Brussels and later worked as an economist for the World Bank from 1972 to 1976. Bazin served as Minister of Finance and Economy for six months in 1982.

He was considered to be the favorite Haitian presidential candidate of the George H. W. Bush administration and the bourgeois population of Haiti. When the country could no longer last in foreign relations as a military dictatorship and had to open the government up to free elections in 1990, Bazin was seen as a front runner if the elections were to happen before the Left in Haiti had time to reorganize.

Ultimately, Bazin received 14% of the vote, Jean-Bertrand Aristide winning the Haitian general election, 1990–1991 with 67%. After nine months, Aristide was deposed by a military coup. In June 1992, the army appointed Bazin as acting president. Washington's initial response was that he held the post illegally, but they soon warmed up to him and pressed Aristide to negotiate with the military and Bazin. With the change in administrations from Bush to Clinton, the policy changed. He resigned on June 8, 1993.

Bazin was also a fervent political opponent of Aristide, and ran in the 2006 election for the presidency of Haiti, but was reported to have received only about 0.68% of the vote in the 35-candidate race.

Bazin died of prostate cancer at his home in Pétion-Ville, Port-au-Prince on 16 June 2010.

References

External links 
 Marc Louis Bazin dead at 78
 Apres Duvalier Marc Bazin A St Marc
 
 Jacques Despinosse and Marc Bazin cohost town hall meeting
 "Aristide's Rise and Fall", International Socialist Review, Issue 35, May–June 2004, ASHLEY SMITH

Prime Ministers of Haiti
Finance ministers of Haiti
1932 births
2010 deaths